Nazmun Munira Nancy, commonly known as Nancy, is a Bangladeshi singer. She won Bangladesh National Film Award for Best Female Playback Singer for her playback in the film Projapoti (2011). She received Meril-Prothom Alo Awards Best Female Singer Award for six times.

Career
Nazmun Munira Nancy began her career in 2002. She has sung several jingles for television. She became an enlisted artist at Bangladesh Betar in 2002 as a Nazrul, modern and folk singer.

Nancy sang the songs "Prithibir Joto Shukh" and "Hawaye Hawaye Dolna Doley" in a film Akash Chhoa Bhalobasa (2008). In a film Chandragrohon (2008), she sang "Tomare Dekhilo Porano Bhoriya" with Habib Wahid. She sang "Sparsh" in a film Projapoti (2011).

Discography

Studio albums
Bhalobasa Odhora (2010)
Nancy (2010)
Rong (2012)
Mayabi Akash Nil (2013)
Jhograr Gaan (2013) duet with Asif Akbar
Megher Khame (2015)
Dushtu Chhele (2015)
Bhalobashbo Bolei (2016)
Duet albums
Amra Amra – 3
Panjabiwala

Playback career
 Hridoyer Kotha (2006)
 Akash Chhoa Bhalobasa (2008)
 Amar Ache Jol (2008)
 Chandragrohon (2008)
 Third Person Singular Number (2009)
 Khoj: The Search (2010)
 Common Gender (2010)
 Bhalobaslei Ghor Bandha Jay Na (2010)
 Projapoti (2011)
 The Speed (2012)
 Lal Tip (2012)
 Bhalobasar Rong (2012)
 Eito Bhalobasha (2012)
 Tumi Shondharo Meghmala (2013)
 Purno Doirgho Prem Kahini (2013)
 Game (2013)
 Poramon (2013)
 Uru Uru Mon (2014)
 Zero Degree (2015)
 Eito Prem (2015)
 Warning (2015)
 U Turn (2015)
 Niyoti (2016)
 Sweetheart (2016)
 Bossgiri (2016)
 Angaar (2016)
 Sultana Bibiana (2016)
 Ek Prithibi Prem (2016)
 Koto Shopno Koto Asha (2016)
 Hridoy Dolano Prem (2016)
 Apon Manush (2017)

Personal life
In 2006, Nancy married a businessman named Abu Syed Sourob and has a three-year-old daughter, Rodela. On 4 March 2013, Nancy married Nazimuzzaman Zayed, an employee of Mymensingh City Corporation, for the second time. On 8 January 2014, Nancy gave birth to a daughter, Nyla. In August 2014, Nancy attempted to commit suicide by overdosing on sleeping pills in her father's residence in Netrokona District. Her father, Niamul Haque, died on 10 August 2020 at the age of 65. Nancy married lyricist Mohsin Mehedi, the chief operating officer (COO) of Yoga Anupam Music, in 2021 after courtship due to the song. On 13 January 2022, Nancy announced her pregnancy with her third child, Mehenaz.

Awards and nominations

References

External links

Year of birth missing (living people)
Living people
21st-century Bangladeshi women singers
21st-century Bangladeshi singers
Bangladeshi playback singers
Best Female Playback Singer National Film Award (Bangladesh) winners
Best Female Singer Meril-Prothom Alo Award winners